Lychyovo is a rural locality (a village) in Ilyinskoye Rural Settlement, Kolchuginsky District, Vladimir Oblast, Russia. The population was 10 as of 2010.

Geography 
Lychyovo is located 16 km north of Kolchugino (the district's administrative centre) by road. Bolshevik is the nearest rural locality.

References 

Rural localities in Kolchuginsky District